Mariana Díaz Oliva (born 11 March 1976) is a retired tennis player from Argentina.

She played professionally from September 1992 until 12 October 2006. Her highest ranks were world No. 42 for singles and No. 93 for doubles, both achieved in 2001. At the 2001 Bol Open, she defeated Kim Clijsters to reach the final, where she lost to Ángeles Montolio. In 2002, she won the Internazionali Femminili di Palermo. In 2003, she also reached the Mexican Open singles final.

WTA career finals

Singles: 3 (1 title, 2 runner-ups)

Doubles: 2 (runner-ups)

ITF finals

Singles: 27 (16–11)

Doubles: 23 (15–8)

External links

 
 
 

1976 births
Living people
Tennis players from Buenos Aires
Argentine female tennis players
Olympic tennis players of Argentina
Tennis players at the 1999 Pan American Games
Tennis players at the 2004 Summer Olympics
Pan American Games bronze medalists for Argentina
Pan American Games medalists in tennis
Medalists at the 1999 Pan American Games
20th-century Argentine women
21st-century Argentine women